The 2011–12 Lebanese Women's Football League was the 5th edition of the Lebanese Women's Football League since its inception in 2008. Four-time defending champions Sadaka won their fifth title, while GFA came second.

League table

See also
2011–12 Lebanese Women's FA Cup

References

External links
RSSSF.com

Lebanese Women's Football League seasons
W1
2011–12 domestic women's association football leagues